The Joseph Scales House is a property in Triune, Tennessee, United States, that was listed on the National Register of Historic Places in 1988, and delisted in 2022. It dates from c. 1845. It includes Central passage plan and other architecture. The NRHP eligibility for the property was addressed in a 1988 study of Williamson County historical resources.

See also
James Scales House, Kirkland, Tennessee, also NRHP-listed

References

Central-passage houses in Tennessee
Greek Revival houses in Tennessee
Houses completed in 1845
Houses in Williamson County, Tennessee
Houses on the National Register of Historic Places in Tennessee
National Register of Historic Places in Williamson County, Tennessee
Former National Register of Historic Places in Tennessee